Goggia microlepidota, also known as the small-scaled dwarf leaf-toed gecko, small-scaled leaf-toed gecko, or  small-scaled gecko, is a species of lizard in the Gekkonidae family. It is endemic to South Africa.

References

Further reading
 Branch, Bill. 2004. Field Guide to Snakes and Other Reptiles of Southern Africa. Third Revised edition. Second impression. Sanibel Island, Florida: Ralph Curtis Books. 399 pp. . (Goggia microlepidota, p. 242 + Plate 87).
 FitzSimons VFM. 1939. Descriptions of some new species and subspecies of lizards from South Africa. Ann. Transvaal Mus. (Pretoria) 20 (1): 5–16. (Phyllodactylus microlepidotus, new species).

Goggia
Geckos of Africa
Endemic reptiles of South Africa
Reptiles described in 1939
Taxa named by Vivian Frederick Maynard FitzSimons
Taxonomy articles created by Polbot